Marcus Wheeler  is a Singaporean footballer who plays as a defender for S.League club Young Lions.

Career 

He started his career with Tanjong Pagar United before moving to the Warriors when the team pulled out of the Sleague in 2015. 

He then moved on to the Young Lions after his contract with the Warriors is not renewed for the 2016 season.

Career statistics

. Caps and goals may not be correct

 Young Lions are ineligible for qualification to AFC competitions in their respective leagues.

References

External links 

1994 births
Living people
Singaporean footballers
Association football midfielders
Singapore Premier League players
Young Lions FC players